

Boarding School (Sekolah Berasarama Penuh)

 Sekolah Menengah Kebangsaan Bukit Mentok, Kemaman
 Maktab Rendah Sains MARA Kota Putra, Besut
 Maktab Rendah Sains MARA Kuala Berang
 Maktab Rendah Sains MARA Kuala Terengganu
 Maktab Rendah Sains MARA Yayasan Terengganu, Besut
 SAM Unwanus Saadah
 Sekolah Berasrama Penuh Integrasi Batu Rakit

Chinese Type Primary and Secondary School

Chinese Primary School
 SJK (C) CHEE MONG
 SJK (C) CHONG HWA
 SJK (C) CHUKAI
 SJK (C) CHUNG HWA
 SJK (C) CHUNG HWA WEI SIN
 SJK (C) JABOR
 SJK (C) KUALA KEMAMAN
 SJK (C) KWANG HWA
 SJK (C) LOK KHOON
 SJK (C) SIN CHONE

SMJK School
 Sekolah Menengah Jenis Kebangsaan Chung Hwa Wei Sin

SK School- Government Type Primary School
 Sekolah Kebangsaan Sultan Ismail 
 Sekolah Kebangsaan Seri Gelugor, Kerteh
 Sekolah Kebangsaan Kampung Rahmat
 Sekolah Kebangsaan (Felda) Cerul
 Sekolah Kebangsaan Alor Lintah
 Sekolah Kebangsaan Bukit Chempaka
 Sekolah Kebangsaan Bukit Losong
 Sekolah Kebangsaan Bukit Mundok
 Sekolah Kebangsaan Batu Puteh, Kerteh
 Sekolah Kebangsaan Bukit Pahang, Kerteh
 Sekolah Kebangsaan Bukit Payong
 Sekolah Kebangsaan Bukit Sawa
 Sekolah Kebangsaan Bukit Tok Beng
 Sekolah Kebangsaan Bukit Wan
 Sekolah Kebangsaan Cendering
 Sekolah Kebangsaan Chukai
 Sekolah Kebangsaan Darat Batu Rakit
 Sekolah Kebangsaan Darau, Jerteh
 Sekolah Kebangsaan Gong Bayor
 Sekolah Kebangsaan Gong Kapas
 Sekolah Kebangsaan Gong Tok Nasek
 Sekolah Kebangsaan Kerteh, Kemaman
 Sekolah Kebangsaan Kampung Chabang, Kerteh
 Sekolah Kebangsaan Kampung Bukit
 Sekolah Kebangsaan Kampong Raja
 Sekolah Kebangsaan Ketengah Jaya
 Sekolah Kebangsaan Kuala Berang
 Sekolah Kebangsaan Kuala Dungun
 Sekolah Kebangsaan Pusat Dungun
 Sekolah Kebangsaan Balai Besar Dungun
 Sekolah Kebangsaan Bandar Dungun
 Sekolah Kebangsaan Kubang Ikan
 Sekolah Kebangsaan Maras
 Sekolah Kebangsaan Mengabang Telipot
 Sekolah kebangsaan Padang Mengkuang
 Sekolah Kebangsaan Pasir Gajah
 Sekolah Kebangsaan Pusat
 Sekolah Kebangsaan Sura
 Sekolah Kebangsaan Seri Bandi
 Sekolah Kebangsaan Seri Bandi 2
 Sekolah Kebangsaan Seri Iman
 Sekolah Kebangsaan Seri Kemaman
 Sekolah Kebangsaan Seri Nilam Cabang Tiga
 Sekolah Kebangsaan Seri Payong Jerteh :ms:Sekolah Kebangsaan Seri Payong
 Sekolah Kebangsaan Simpang Rawai
 Sekolah Kebangsaan Pasir Panjang
 Sekolah Kebangsaan Pasir Tinggi
 Sekolah Kebangsaan Pecah Rotan
 Sekolah Kebangsaan Seberang Takir
 Sekolah Kebangsaan Seri Paka
 Sekolah Kebangsaan Sultan Sulaiman 1 
 Sekolah Kebangsaan Sultan Sulaiman II
 Sekolah Kebangsaan Tasek
 Sekolah Kebangsaan Teluk Ketapang
 Sekolah Kebangsaan Tembila (SK Tembila)
 Sekolah Kebangsaan Tengku Ampuan Mariam (SKTAM)
 Sekolah Kebangsaan Tengku Bariah
 Sekolah Kebangsaan Tengku Mahmud II
 Sekolah Kebangsaan Tok Dir
 Sekolah Kebangsaan Tok Jembal
 Sekolah Kebangsaan Tok Jiring
 Sekolah Kebangsaan Tok Raja

SMK School- Government Type Secondary School

Secondary education: Sekolah Menengah Kebangsaan (SMK)

Sekolah Menengah Kebangsaan Agama
 Sekolah Menengah Agama (Atas) Sultan Zainal Abidin
 Sekolah Menengah Agama Al-Falah
 Sekolah Menengah Kebangsaan Agama Durian Guling
 Sekolah Menengah Kebangsaan Agama Nurul Ittifaq
 Sekolah Menengah Kebangsaan Agama Sheikh Abdul Malek (SHAMS)
 Sekolah Menengah Kebangsaan Agama Tok Jiring
 Sekolah Menengah Kebangsaan Agama Wataniah, Jerteh
 Sekolah Menengah Sains Dungun
 Sekolah Menengah Sains Kuala Terengganu (SESTER)
 Sekolah Menengah Sains Sultan Mahmud (SESMA)
 Sekolah Menengah Teknik Besut
 Sekolah Menengah Teknik Dungun
 Sekolah Menengah Teknik Kemaman
 Sekolah Menengah Teknik Kuala Terengganu
 Sekolah Menengah Teknik Wakaf Tembusu
 Sekolah Menengah Agama Kampung Laut

Terengganu